San Juan del Río is a name shared by at least four towns and cities in Mexico:

San Juan del Río, Querétaro, the largest and best known.

Also:
San Juan del Río Municipality, Querétaro
San Juan del Río, Coahuila
San Juan del Río, Durango
San Juan del Río, Oaxaca
San Juan de Nicaragua, in the Río San Juan Department of Nicaragua